Chen Yung-chi (known in Amis language as Mayaw Ciru;  born 13 July 1983 in Taitung County, Taiwan) is a Taiwanese professional baseball infielder for the Uni-President Lions of the Chinese Professional Baseball League (CPBL).

Professional career

Chen signed with the Seattle Mariners organization as an international free agent on January 15, 2004. In April 2007, while playing for the Triple-A Tacoma Rainiers, Chen underwent surgery on his left shoulder and missed the rest of the season. On November 21, 2007, the Mariners selected Chen's contract to the 40-man roster. On April 13, 2008, Chen was hit in the head by Josh Towers and suffered a mild concussion. On November 12, Chen was claimed off waivers by the Oakland Athletics. On March 6, 2009, Chen was outrighted off of the 40-man roster. He was assigned to the Double-A Midland RockHounds to begin the season and was later promoted to the Sacramento River Cats. Chen began 2010 in Midland but was released on June 2, 2010. On June 24, 2010, Chen signed a minor league contract with the Pittsburgh Pirates organization and was assigned to the Double-A Altoona Curve. On November 6, 2010, Chen elected free agency.

On November 23, 2010, after entering the Chinese Professional Baseball League draft and being drafted by the Uni-President Lions, Chen signed with the Lions. Chen has played for the Lions in every season from 2011 to 2020.

International career
In , he competed in the World Baseball Classic for Chinese Taipei, ranked 3rd in most doubles hit, and hit the first grand slam of WBC (Taiwan vs. China). He played in the All-Star Futures Game during the All-Star break in 2006, with another Taiwanese player Chin-Lung Hu. After the season ended, he competed in the 2006 Intercontinental Cup and Baseball games of 2006 Asian Games. He won the best second baseman award of 2006 Intercontinental Cup, and gold medal of Asian Games.

External links

References

1983 births
2006 World Baseball Classic players
2013 World Baseball Classic players
2015 WBSC Premier12 players
2017 World Baseball Classic players
Altoona Curve players
Arizona League Athletics players
Arizona League Mariners players
Asian Games gold medalists for Chinese Taipei
Asian Games medalists in baseball
Asian Games silver medalists for Chinese Taipei
Baseball players at the 2010 Asian Games
Baseball players at the 2006 Asian Games
Everett AquaSox players
Inland Empire 66ers of San Bernardino players
Living people
Medalists at the 2006 Asian Games
Medalists at the 2010 Asian Games
Midland RockHounds players
People from Taitung County
Peoria Javelinas players
Sacramento River Cats players
San Antonio Missions players
Taiwanese expatriate baseball players in the United States
Tacoma Rainiers players
Uni-President 7-Eleven Lions players
Wisconsin Timber Rattlers players